Tirrel Pond is a lake located northeast of the Hamlet of Blue Mountain Lake, New York. Tirrell Mountain is located northeast and Blue Mountain is located west-southwest of the lake.

References

Lakes of New York (state)
Lakes of Hamilton County, New York